Shirleen Campbell (born 1981) is a Warlpiri, Anmatyerre, Luritja and Arrernte family and domestic violence activist from Mparntwe in the Northern Territory of Australia.

Campbell was born in 1981 and is a third-generation resident of Lhenpe Artnwe. She lost her mother, aunt, and a close friend to domestic violence. 

She is the co-ordinator of the Tangentyere Women's Family Safety Group a family and anti-domestic violence organisation. She was part of a contingent that travelled to Parliament House in Canberra in 2018, to hold a 'sit-in, or sorry ceremony' in memory of the women who have been killed or injured due to family violence. She also directed the three-part documentary Not Just Numbers.

In 2021, Campbell was appointed on the 13-member Aboriginal and Torres Strait Islander Advisory Council supporting the development of a National Plan to end family, domestic and sexual violence in Australia.

Awards 
Campbell the Northern Territory Local Hero in 2020 as part of the Australian of the Year awards.

Not Just Numbers also won Best Broadcast Documentary at the Capricornia Film awards in 2021.

References 

Anti-domestic violence activists
People from Alice Springs
Living people
1981 births